Pepka Boyadjieva is Professor of Sociology at the Institute of Philosophy and Sociology, Bulgarian Academy of Sciences. Chair of the Scientific Council of the Institute for the Study of Societies and Knowledge (2011 – 2019) and of Institute of Philosophy and Sociology (since 2019). Vice-Chair of the General Assembly of the Bulgarian Academy of Sciences (2016 – 2020); President of the Bulgarian Sociological Association (2003 – 2006). Expert for the European Commission and Permanent Senior Fellow at Center for Advanced Studies, Sofia (2006 – 2018). Member of the Editorial Board of the International Sociological Association’s edition Sage Studies in International Sociology (2010 – 2019), Board Member of International Journal of Lifelong Education since 2008 and of Journal of Social Science Education since 2009. Honorary Professor of Sociology of Education at the University of Nottingham; Professor of Sofia University and New Bulgarian University. Her research interests are in the fields of inequalities in education; social justice and education; education, science and social modernization; university and society; lifelong and adult learning; public representation and images of science and scientists.

Biography 
Pepka Alexandrova Boyadjieva was born on December 26, 1954, in the then town of Mihailovgrad, now Montana, Bulgaria. She graduated in philosophy with a specialization in sociology in 1976 at Sofia University, defended her PhD dissertation  in 1980, and the next one for Doctor Habilis of Sociological Sciences in 1999. Her professional career developed mainly at the Institute of Sociology at the Bulgarian Academy of Sciences, where she has held the Senior Research Fellow I degree since 2000. She has chaired the Scientific Council of the Institute for the Study of Societies and Knowledge(renamed as Institute of Philosophy and Sociology in 2019) since 2011 and previously chaired the Scientific Council of the Institute of Sociology from 2004 to 2008. She was a Permanent Senior Fellow at the Center for Advanced Studies, Sofia (2006 – 2018). Professor at the Institute of Philosophy and Sociology since 2010, Honorary Professor of Sociology of Education at the University of Nottingham since 2011. She was President of the Bulgarian Sociological Association (2003 – 2006). She has been lecturing a course on Sociology of Education since 1994 at Sofia University and delivered courses on University Worlds, Institutions of Knowledge and Sociology of Education at New Bulgarian University.

Prof. Boyadjieva is highly committed to the cause of civic activism and social development policies and has been an expert on governmental and non-governmental reform initiatives. She was a long-time expert at the Open Society Institute, Sofia and is currently chairing its board of trustees. She is one of the authors of the current Strategy for the Development of Higher Education in the Republic of Bulgaria 2021-2030. She is a member of “Education without Barriers” Association.

Personal life: Pepka Boyadjieva is wife of Prof. Tzocho Boyadjiev, the internationally renowned Bulgarian philosopher-medievist, poet, art photographer, translator and culturologist. They have a daughter, Laura (physician), and a son, Hristo (lawyer).

Research Accomplishments 

Prof. Boyadjieva took part in more than 30 research projects, being the team-leader in most of them. She is the only representative of social sciences who won a grant for a research project from the National Research Program "Outstanding Studies and People for the Development of European Science" (in Bulgarian - NNP "VIHREN") in 2019. The theme of this 5-year project is "Dynamics of Inequalities in Higher Education and Adult Learning: A Comparative Analysis of Social Justice". Since 2005 she has been acting as evaluator and independent expert for the European Commission. She is a member of the international networks of experts of social dimension of education and learning at the NESET  and NESSE.

Prof. Boyadjieva is one of the few internationally renowned Bulgarian sociologists as since 2000 – her citations in Google Scholar by 2021 alone are over 830 for nearly 300 publications since 1997 with H-index 14, and 273 citations and H-index 7 according to SCOPUS. According to the ResearchGate with a personal score of 20.91, she is more highly recognizable than 75% of the authors in this scientific portal.

Editorial Positions

 British Educational Research Journal (since 2021)
 Journal of Social Science Education (since 2009)
 International Journal of Lifelong Education (since 2008)
 Bulgarian Journal of Science and Education Policy (since 2008)
 Sociological Problems (Journal of the Bulgarian Sociological Association and the Institute of Philosophy and Sociology at the Bulgarian Academy of Sciences) (since 1995)
 ISA's SSIS – Series Sage Studies in International Sociology Books (2010 –  2019)

Awards and Grants 
 2022 "Cyril O. Houle Award" for Outstanding Literature in Adult Education for the book: Adult Education as Empowerment: Re-imagining Lifelong Learning through the Capability Approach, Recognition Theory and Common Goods Perspective
 2021 "Marin Drinov" ribbon badge of honour of the Bulgarian Academy of Sciences
 2020 Badge of honour of the Institute of Philosophy and Sociology at the Bulgarian Academy of Sciences
 2007-8 New Century Scholars – Fulbright Program “Higher Education in the 21st Century: Access and Equity”
 2003 Andrew Mellon Award, American Academy in Rome
 1999 Andrew Mellon Award, Institute for Advanced Studies in the Humanities, University of Edinburgh
 1990 Voltaire Foundation grant for participation in a Summer school, University of Oxford

Selected works 

Authored and co-autored books
 
 
 

 Boyadjieva, P. (2010). Social Engineering: Admission Policies in Higher Education during the Communist Regime in Bulgaria. Sofia: CIELA (in Bulgarian) 
 Boyadjieva, P. (1998). University and Society: Two Sociological Cases.  Sofia: LIK (in Bulgarian) 
 Boyadjieva, P., Gerganov, E., Paspalanova, E., Petkova, K. (1994). Education outside the School Doors. Sofia: Gal Iko (in Bulgarian) 
 Boyadjieva, P., Petkova, K., Chalakov, I. (1994). Science: Life outside the Laboratory. Sofia: Bulgarian Academy of Sciences Press (in Bulgarian) 
 Boyadjieva, P. (1992). The Birth of the University. Sofia: Kritika i humanism (in Bulgarian).
 Boyadjieva, P. (1985). What Can Education Give Us? Sofia: Nauka i Iskustvo (in Bulgarian).

Edited books
 Koleva, S., Boyadjeiva, P., Kabakchieva, P., Kolarova, R. (Eds.) (2021). Bringing down Barriers. Disciplines, Epochs, Generations. Sofia: University Publishing House “St. Kl. Ohridski” (In Bulgarian) 
 Boyadjieva, P., Kanoushev, M., Ivanov, M. (2018) (Eds.). Inequalities and Social (Dis)integration: In Search of Togetherness. Sofia: Iztok-Zapad (In Bulgarian and English) 
 Boyadjieva, P., Stoyanova, R. (Eds.) (2017). The Gift and Cultures of Giving for Education: Theories Institutions, Individuals. Sofia: Iztok-Zapad (In Bulgarian and English)
 Burnaski, G., Boyadjieva, P., Kabakchieva, P. (2015). (Eds.). State Security - Unions, Business life and Workers. Documentary collection. Sofia: KRDOPBGDSRSBNA and Research Institute of the Recent Past (In Bulgarian) 
 Boyadjieva, P. Koleva, S., Koev, K. (2006). (Eds.) Worlds in Sociology. Sofia: Sofia University Publishing House (in Bulgarian) 
 Boyadjieva, P. (1999) (Ed.) University Autonomy and Academic Responsibility. Sofia: LIK (in Bulgarian)
 Boyadjieva, P. (1999) (Ed.) Dimensions of the University Idea. Sofia: Sofia University Publishing House (in Bulgarian) 

Selected Articles and Book Chapters

 
 
 
 Boyadjieva, P. (2017). Cultures of giving in the sphere of education: theoretical frameworks and research approaches. In: Boyadjieva, P., Stoyanova, R. (Eds.) (2017). The Gift and Cultures of Giving for Education: Theories Institutions, Individuals. Sofia: Iztok-Zapad, 27-62 (In Bulgarian).
 Boyadjieva, P. (2013). Admission Policies as a Mechanism for Social Engineering: The Case of the Bulgarian Communist Regime, Comparative Education Review 57 (3): 503–526.

External links 

 Institute of Philosophy and Sociology at the Bulgarian Academy of Sciences
 Bulgarian Sociological Association
 Network of Experts in Social Sciences of Education and training (NESSE) at Directorate-General for Education, Youth, Sport and Culture

References 

Bulgarian sociologists
Bulgarian women sociologists
Bulgarian women academics
Sofia University alumni
Living people
1954 births